The Republican Party of Rio Grande do Sul (PRR) was a Brazilian political party founded on February 23, 1882. It was dissolved in 1937 due to the Estado Novo.

References 

First Brazilian Republic
Defunct political parties in Brazil
Political parties established in 1882
Political parties disestablished in 1929
1882 establishments in Brazil
1929 disestablishments in Brazil
Republican parties